Paratalanta hyalinalis, the translucent pearl, is a species of moth of the family Crambidae. It was described by Jacob Hübner in 1796.

Description
The wingspan of Paratalanta hyalinalis can reach . The translucent wings are whitish or yellowish, crossed by thin pale brown lines. The moth flies from June to July depending on the location. They are active after dark. The larvae are oligophagous (feed on only a few types of food) and eat nettle, Verbascum thapsus and Centaurea jacea.

Distribution
This species can be found in most of Europe, but has also been recorded from North Africa, including Libya.

References

External links
 
 Lepiforum.de

Pyraustinae
Moths described in 1796
Moths of Africa
Moths of Europe
Taxa named by Jacob Hübner